Sinnayah Karuppiah Jarabalan (1937 – 1990) was a Malaysian sprinter. He competed in the men's 100 metres at the 1956 Summer Olympics.

References

External links
 

1937 births
1990 deaths
Athletes (track and field) at the 1956 Summer Olympics
Malaysian male sprinters
Olympic athletes of Malaya
Place of birth missing